Palmierite, K2Pb(SO4)2, is a rare sulfate mineral. Its presence was detected in the Voynich manuscript. It has been found in areas of volcanic activity.

References

Sulfate minerals
Lead minerals